A constitutional referendum was held in Rwanda on 26 May 2003. The new constitution created a presidential republic with a bicameral parliament, and banned the incitement of racial hatred. It was approved by 93% of voters with a 90% voter turnout. Following its approval, presidential elections were held on 25 August and parliamentary elections on 29–30 September.

Results

References

2003
2003 in Rwanda
2003 referendums
2003 referendum
Constitutional referendums